Do you want:

NSMC - North/South Ministerial Council. A body established under the Belfast Agreement (also known as the Good Friday Agreement) to co-ordinate activity and exercise certain limited governmental powers across the island of Ireland
NSMC - North Shore Medical Center a hospital complex in Salem, Massachusetts.
NSMC - National Student Marketing Corporation the name of a high-flying stock in the mid-1960s.  Later was investigated for fraud.
NSMC - Nawaz Sharif Medical College, a medical school situated in Gujrat, Pakistan.
NSMC - National Student Media Conference a conference in Newcastle, New South Wales Australia.   It is part of the larger This Is Not Art (TINA) Festival.